The Teatro Colón (Spanish: Columbus Theatre) is the main opera house in Buenos Aires, Argentina. It is considered one of the ten best opera houses in the world by National Geographic. According to a survey carried out by the acoustics expert Leo Beranek among leading international opera and orchestra directors, the Teatro Colón has the room with the best acoustics for opera and the second best for concerts in the world.

The present Colón replaced an original theatre which opened in 1857. Towards the end of the century, it became clear that a new theatre was needed, and after a 20-year process, the present theatre opened on 25 May 1908, with Giuseppe Verdi's Aïda.

The Teatro Colón was visited by the foremost singers and opera companies of the time, who would sometimes go on to other cities including Montevideo, Rio de Janeiro and São Paulo.

After this period of huge international success, the theatre's decline became clear and plans were made for massive renovations. After an initial start of works to restore the landmark in 2005, the theatre was closed for refurbishment from October 2006 to May 2010. It re-opened on 24 May 2010, with a programme for the 2010 season.

History
The Colón theater operated in two buildings, the first located in the Plaza de Mayo until 1888 and the second located in front of the Plaza Lavalle, which took 20 years to be built until its inauguration in 1908. This land formerly housed the Park Station, the first railway station of the Argentine Republic as head of the Western Railway of Buenos Aires.

Throughout its history the main figures of opera, classical music and world ballet have performed in the Colón theater, such as Arturo Toscanini, Nijinski, Luisa Tetrazzini, Enrico Caruso, Conchita Supervia, Regina Pacini, Anna Pavlova, Maya Plisetskaya, Margot Fonteyn, Mikhail Barishnikov, Antonio Gades, Richard Strauss, Igor Stravinsky, Camille Saint-Saens, Manuel de Falla, Aaron Copland, Herbert von Karajan, Leonard Bernstein, Mstislav Rostropovich, Zubin Mehta, Maria Callas, Renata Tebaldi, Leontyne Price, Ana Serrano Redonnet, Celia Torra, Yehudi Menuhin, Pau Casals, Rudolf Nureyev, Maurice Béjart, Plácido Domingo, José Carreras, Luciano Pavarotti, Lily Pons, Marina de Gabaráin, Victoria de los Ángeles, Reri Grist, Montserrat Caballé, Kiri Te Kanawa, among others, and Argentine artists such as Adelaida Negri, Héctor Panizza, Alberto Ginastera, Jorge Donn, Norma Fontenla, José Neglia, Olga Ferri, Julio Bocca, Maximiliano Guerra, Paloma Herrera, Daniel Barenboim, Martha Argerich, Astor Piazzolla, Aníbal Troilo and Osvaldo Pugliese. In the last decade other popular artists such as Chris Cornell, Katherine Jenkins, Sarah Brightman, Joss Stone, Branford Marsalis, play here.

Among the main events of its history are the creation of stable bodies in the 1920s and its municipalization in 1931. In 1946, Peronism promoted a policy of openness to popular music and greater democratization of the public, which was reverted after its overthrow in 1955 and again resumed when democracy recovered in 1983.

In 2006 a full restoration work was started that would extend until 2010, when it was reopened on May 24 in commemoration of the Bicentennial of Argentina.

The first Teatro Colón
The first Teatro Colón was designed by Charles Pellegrini, and proved to be a successful venue for over 30 years, with 2,500 seats with the inclusion of a separate gallery reserved only for people who were in mourning. The construction started in 1856 and completed in 1857. This was celebrated with an opening on April 27, 1857, with Verdi's La traviata, just four years after its Italian premiere. The production starred Sofia Vera Lorini as Violetta and Enrico Tamberlik as Alfredo.

This theater was closed on September 13, 1888 to step aside for a new improved building, which was opened twenty years later on Libertad street, overlooking Plaza Lavalle. In that period of time, the 1890 crisis and its effects were the cause for the delay in the completion of this second theater.

Before the construction of the current Teatro Colón, opera performances were given in several theatres, of which the first Teatro Colón and the Teatro Opera were the most important. The principal company that performed at the Teatro Opera moved to the Teatro Colón in 1908. However, major companies also performed at the Teatro Politeama and the Teatro Coliseo which opened in 1907.

The present Teatro Colón

Characteristics
The theatre is bounded by the wide 9 de Julio Avenue (technically Cerrito Street), Libertad Street (the main entrance), Arturo Toscanini Street, and Tucumán Street. It is in the heart of the city on a site once occupied by Ferrocarril Oeste's Plaza Parque station.

The auditorium is horseshoe-shaped, has 2,487 seats (slightly more than the Royal Opera House in Covent Garden, London), standing room for 1,000 and a stage which is 20 m wide, 15 m high and 20 m deep. The low-rise building has 6 floors above ground and 3 below ground, 7 elevators with a facade of applied masonry. It has a large central chandelier with 700 light bulbs. The original architect was the Italian Francesco Tamburini; after his death it was completed by the Belgian architect Julio Dormal. The original auditorium "had eight boxes with metal grilles and a separate entrance, so that those in mourning could still attend performances, but remain dignifiedly sequestered from public view".

The Colon's acoustics are considered to be so good as to place it in the top five performance venues in the world. Luciano Pavarotti held a similar opinion.

Opening and subsequent history
The present theatre, the second with that name, opened on 25 May 1908, after twenty years under construction, and was inaugurated with Aida by the Italian company directed by Luigi Mancinelli and tenor Amedeo Bassi, soprano Lucia Crestani (as Aida). The second presentation was Thomas' Hamlet with the baritone Titta Ruffo During the inaugural season seventeen operas were performed with famous stars such as Ruffo, Feodor Chaliapin in Boito's Mefistofele, Antonio Paoli in Verdi's Otello.

The cornerstone of the present Teatro Colón was laid in 1889 under the direction of architect Francesco Tamburini and his pupil, Vittorio Meano, who designed a theatre in the Italian style on a scale and with amenities which matched those in Europe.  However, delays followed due to financial difficulties, arguments regarding the location, the death of Tamburini in 1891, the murder of Meano in 1904 and the death of Angelo Ferrari, an Italian businessman who was financing the new theatre. The building was finally completed in 1908 under the direction of the Belgian architect Julio Dormal who made some changes in the structure and left his mark in the French style of the decoration.  The bas-reliefs and busts on the facade are the work of sculptor Luigi Trinchero.

The theatre's opening on 25 May, the Día de la Patria in Argentina, featured a performance of Verdi's Aida and it quickly became a world-famous operatic venue rivaling La Scala and the Metropolitan Opera in attracting most of the world's best opera singers and conductors.

The Teatro was bombed by anarchists in 1910; Georges Clemenceau was present in Argentina during the attack. The bomb landed in the middle of the orchestra. Clemenceau describes the attack as follows: "The horror can not be exaggerated. A senior official told me that he had never seen such puddles of blood. The wounded were carried off as best as possible, and the room was emptied by the cries of fury, and the material damage repaired during the day which followed, not a woman of society missed the representation of the morrow. It is a fine trait of character that particularly honors the female element of the Argentine nation. I am not quite sure that in Paris the hall would have been full in such cases."

Ballet stars performed at the Colón alongside Argentine dancers and classical instrumentalists. This included the prima ballerina, Lida Martinoli. When she retired from dancing, Martinoli began to choreograph. She died in Santa Fe. The tragic 1971 aviation death of two of the best known of these, Norma Fontenla and José Neglia, was commemorated with a monument in neighbouring Lavalle Square.

With excellent acoustics and modern stage areas, the theatre's interior design features a rich scarlet and gold decor. The cupola contains canvas painted in 1966 by the 20th-century artist Raúl Soldi during renovation work.

Refurbishment, 2005 – 2010
In recent years, given the political and economic circumstances of Argentina, the Teatro Colón has suffered considerably, but a period of slow recovery began.  The theatre underwent massive phased remodelling of both interior and exterior, initially while the house was still open, but production activities ceased at the end of December 2006 to allow full refurbishment.

Initially, "what had been planned as an 18-month, $25-million renovation with 500 workers, scheduled for a May 2008 reopening with Aida, became a three-year $100-million extravaganza with 1,500 workers including 130 professional architects and engineers."  In addition, an exterior open-air stage was planned for an opening in 2011. In all,  underwent updating, both inside and out.

Some of the last performances immediately before closure of the theatre's building were  Swan Lake on 30 September with the Ballet Estable del Teatro Colón and the Buenos Aires Philharmonic (Orquesta Filarmónica de Buenos Aires). and, on 28 October, the opera Boris Godunov was given featuring Orquesta Estable del Teatro Colón and the house chorus.

The theatre's final performance before its closure for refurbishment works in 2005 was a concert on 1 November starring folklore singer Mercedes Sosa in performance with the Argentine National Symphony Orchestra, conducted by Pedro Ignacio Calderón.

While it was originally planned to reopen in time for the centenary on 25 May 2008, delays prevented this, and the house was finally reopened with a gala concert and 3D animations on 24 May 2010, the eve of its own 102nd birthday and the Argentina Bicentennial. Tchaikovsky's Swan Lake and Act 2 of Puccini's La bohème were performed. A private concert to test the acoustics attended by employees, architects, and others involved in the renovation occurred on 6 May 2010. On the 6 September 2013, the Teatro Colón hosted the Opening Ceremony of the 125th Session of the International Olympic Committee.

Image gallery

See also

List of buildings
List of concert halls
Kirchner Cultural Centre

References
Notes

Sources
 Caamaño, Roberto. Historia del Teatro Colón, Vol I-III, Cinetea, Buenos Aires, 1969.
 Ferro, Valenti. Las voces del Teatro Colón, Buenos Aires, 1982
 Garland, Marguerite. Mas allá del gran telón. Buenos Aires, 1990
 Hoos, Monica, El Teatro Colón, 2003, 
 Lynn, Karyl Charna, "Restoration Drama", Opera Now, (London) Sept/Oct 2010, pp. 28–30
 Matera, J. H., Teatro Colón Años de gloria 1908–1958, Buenos Aires, 1958. ML1717.8.B9 T4
 Moyano, Julia. Teatro Colon A telon abierto. 
 Pollini, Margarita. Palco, cazuela y paraíso. Las historias más insólitas del Teatro Colón. 2002
 Sessa, Aldo, Manuel Mujica Láinez, Vida y gloria del Teatro Colón. 1983. 
 Sessa, Aldo. El mágico mundo del Teatro Colón. 1995. 
 Sessa, Aldo. ALMAS, ANGELES Y DUENDES DEL TEATRO COLON,

External links

Official website
History of opera in Buenos Aires
 Website with interior photos of the house
 Description of a visit to Buenos Aires' Premier Opera House
 Description of a visit to the Teatro Colon at the end of October 2006, just before its closure for refurbishment until 25 May 2008
 Panoramic virtual tour of inside the theatre in 2004
 Architectural History of the Teatro Colon
 "On with the Show! A Celebration of the 100th Anniversary and Restoration of the Teatro Colón in Buenos Aires, Argentina
 Teatro Colon 2014 Opera Program

Concert halls in Argentina
Opera houses in Argentina
San Nicolás, Buenos Aires
Argentine opera companies
Teatro Colon
Teatro Colon
Teatro Colon
Teatro Colon
Theatres in Buenos Aires
Music venues completed in 1857
Theatres completed in 1857
Teatro Colon
Music venues completed in 1908
Theatres completed in 1908